Ziemnice may refer to the following places in Poland:
Ziemnice, Lower Silesian Voivodeship (south-west Poland)
Ziemnice, Greater Poland Voivodeship (west-central Poland)